El Carmen de Siquirres Airport  is an airport serving the village and Del Monte banana plantation at El Carmen in Limón Province, Costa Rica.

See also

 Transport in Costa Rica
 List of airports in Costa Rica

References

External links
 OurAirports - El Carmen de Siquirres
 OpenStreetMap - El Carmen de Siquirres
 FalllingRain - El Carmen de Siquirres
 Del Monte banana plantation video
 

Airports in Costa Rica
Limón Province